Jack Carl Dean, better known by his online alias JaackMaate, is a British YouTuber, podcast host, sports presenter and comedian. He is primarily known for his "opinionated and frank" discussion of YouTube content, and as the host of the comedy podcast series JaackMaate's Happy Hour Podcast, which consistently tops the Spotify most-listened charts. He also gained national media attention when he staged a demonstration in response to Boris Johnson's rule-breaking during the national lockdown. 

In 2019, Dean was listed at #88 in The Sunday Times''' list of the top 100 most influential online creators in the United Kingdom. He also appeared on Big Brother as a contestant for one week.

Career
YouTube
Dean found an audience on video sharing site YouTube through his "opinionated and frank" commentary on celebrity culture on the site.
His criticism included overpriced merchandise sold to fans, subpar content from vloggers and a disconnect from the core audience. This was exemplified in Dean's comedic criticism of vlogger Zoella's advent calendar, which he deemed to be overpriced.

In response to UK Prime Minister Boris Johnson's alleged breaking of lockdown rules, Dean organised one-hundred members of the public to dress as Johnson and protest outside Downing Street. The stunt received wide media recognition and acclaim.

JaackMaate's Happy Hour Podcast
Dean has been the host of JaackMaate's Happy Hour Podcast since 2018.

The podcast has had notable guests including Belle Delphine, Ricky Gervais, Raphael Rowe and Asim Chaudhry."Meet the natives; What persuaded Ricky Gervais to appear on a YouTuber's podcast?" Radio Times, 13 Oct. 2020, p. 116. Accessed 20 July 2022. The show was described by Radio Times'' as "intimate interviews with the internet's best celebrities to join the conversation about everything from moral dilemmas to life's big questions in their show of the week column". In September 2020, Dean announced he had signed an exclusive multi-year Spotify podcast deal.

In February 2023, Dean took the show on tour alongside fellow hosts Stevie White, Robbie Knox and Alfie Indra. The tour was a success and was extended for a further seventeen dates in April and May 2023.

Personal life 
Dean has been open about his diagnosis of OCD and his bouts with anxiety and depression. In particular, his OCD manifests itself as health anxiety, which caused him to avoid seeing the doctor for fear of an extreme diagnosis.

Dean became engaged to long-time girlfriend Fiona South in 2018.

References 

Year of birth missing (living people)
Living people
British YouTubers
Commentary YouTubers